Christian Hunter Greene (born August 6, 1999) is an American professional baseball pitcher for the Cincinnati Reds of Major League Baseball (MLB). The Reds selected him second overall in the 2017 MLB Draft.

Born in Los Angeles, California, Greene learned how to pitch at the Major League Baseball Urban Youth Academy in Compton. The Reds drafted Greene out of high school, and he joined their farm system rather than playing college baseball. Greene suffered an ulnar collateral ligament injury partway through the 2018 season and underwent Tommy John surgery the following year. The COVID-19 pandemic kept him from pitching for another year, but once he returned in 2021, he quickly rose through the minor leagues.

Greene made the Reds' Opening Day roster in 2022. In only the second game of his major league career, he set an MLB record by throwing 39 pitches with a velocity of at least .

Early life 
Greene was born on August 6, 1999, in Los Angeles, California. His mother Senta worked as an educational consultant, while his father Russell worked as a private investigator for Johnnie Cochran. In 2007, when he was seven years old, he joined the Major League Baseball Urban Youth Academy in Compton, California. Greene learned how to pitch at the instructional facility and appeared in several youth showcase events hosted by Major League Baseball (MLB), such as the Junior Home Run Derby at the 2016 MLB All-Star Game at Petco Park.

At Notre Dame High School in Sherman Oaks, Los Angeles, Greene played shortstop when he was not pitching. Over four high school baseball seasons, Greene had a career 1.62 earned run average (ERA) in  innings pitched, striking out over 30 percent of the batters he faced. This included a senior season in which he had a 3–0 win–loss record and 0.75 ERA in five appearances, striking out 43 batters and walking four in 28 innings. Offensively, Greene batted .324 with six home runs, 28 runs batted in (RBI), six doubles, two triples, 23 runs scored, a .374 on-base percentage, and a .598 slugging percentage. In April 2017, Greene became the 13th high school athlete to appear on the cover of Sports Illustrated, and the first high school baseball player since Bryce Harper in 2009.

Professional career

Draft and minor leagues (2017–2021)
Despite media projections that Greene would be the first overall pick in the 2017 MLB draft, the Minnesota Twins selected Royce Lewis, and Greene was instead taken second overall by the Cincinnati Reds. Greene, who had been committed to play college baseball for the UCLA Bruins since he was a freshman in high school, ultimately agreed to a professional contract with the Reds only a few minutes before the 2 p.m. (PDT) signing deadline on July 7. His $7.23 million signing bonus was the highest of any player since the draft slot system was overhauled in 2012 and the highest of any player since Gerrit Cole signed with the Pittsburgh Pirates in 2011 for $8 million. Once he signed with the Reds, Greene was assigned to the Billings Mustangs, their farm system team in the Rookie-level Pioneer League. Primarily used as a pitcher, Greene also saw time as a designated hitter on days when he did not pitch. He started in three games for the Mustangs, going 0–1 with a 12.46 ERA in the process while striking out six batters in  innings. At the plate, he batted .233 with three RBI in 30 at bats across 10 games.

Greene had difficulty adjusting to the older, more experienced hitters he faced in the Midwest League: in his first five starts, his ERA was 13.97, and opposing hitters batted .420 against him. He improved with coaching, however, with a nine-game stretch in which he pitched to a 2.78 ERA and struck out 54 batters in  innings before pitching in the 2018 All-Star Futures Game. Greene's 2018 season came to an end at the start of August when he sprained the ulnar collateral ligament of his right elbow. He made 18 starts for Dayton before the injury, during which he went 3–7 with a 4.48 ERA and 89 strikeouts. The Reds medical staff had hoped that the injury would improve through nonsurgical rehabilitation, but in March 2019, Greene suffered a setback, and he underwent Tommy John surgery to repair the ligament.

Greene, like other MLB prospects, did not pitch in 2020 either, as the COVID-19 pandemic forced the cancellation of the Minor League Baseball season. When he returned to professional baseball in 2021, he was assigned to the Double-A Chattanooga Lookouts of the Southern League. He made seven starts there, during which he went 5–0 with a 1.98 ERA and struck out 60 batters in 41 innings, before receiving a promotion to the Triple-A Louisville Bats on June 15. Greene started 14 games after the promotion, during which he went 5–8 with a 4.13 ERA and struck out 79 batters in  innings. The Reds put Greene on an innings limit for the season, and he was shut down on September 17 after pitching  innings. Between Chattanooga and Louisville, Greene had a 3.30 ERA and 139 strikeouts for the season. That November, the Reds added Greene to their 40-man roster to protect him from being taken in the Rule 5 draft.

Cincinnati Reds (2022–present)
After impressing coaches during spring training, Greene made the Reds' Opening Day roster for the 2022 MLB season. He made his major league debut on April 10, earning the win in a 6–3 Cincinnati victory over defending World Series champions the Atlanta Braves. Greene allowed three earned runs on four hits while striking out seven batters over five innings. The previous record was set by Jacob deGrom of the New York Mets, who threw 33 pitches at that velocity on June 5, 2021. Despite this performance, the Reds lost the game 5–2. Greene had a difficult start to his major league career, going 1–5 with a 7.62 ERA and allowing 11 home runs in his first six starts. He improved over his next six games, going 2–2 with a 3.18 ERA while allowing only four home runs. On August 1, Greene pitched six scoreless innings against the Miami Marlins. It was his third outing in which he pitched at least six innings, struck out eight or more batters while allowing no more than one hit, a record for rookie pitchers in the live-ball era. Four days later, Greene, who had previously experienced arm fatigue during his starts, was placed on the injured list with a right shoulder strain.

National team career 
Greene first represented the United States in international competition at the 2014 U-15 Baseball World Cup in Mexico. He struck out four batters and allowed one unearned run on three hits in his first outing, a 14–2 rout of Panama. Greene took the win in the game, while his fastball reached . Greene and the US team were only silver medalists, however, as Cuba defeated Team USA 10–2 in the championship match. Greene lasted only two innings in this final outing, allowing three runs on three hits while striking out two.

The year after his silver medal performance at the U15 tournament, Greene once again represented the United States at the 2015 U-18 Baseball World Cup in Japan. Greene and the rest of Team USA won the gold medal in a 2–1 championship victory over the host team.

Pitcher profile 
Greene's primary pitch is his four-seam fastball. His breaking balls are a slider and a changeup. While he was in the Reds' farm system, there was some concern over Greene's ability to develop an off-speed pitch to complement his fastball. He stopped throwing a curveball in order to focus on his slider, and his command improved as he progressed through the minor leagues. His changeup was not as developed when Greene made his major league debut, with Fangraphs rating the pitch only a 40 out of 80.

Personal life
Greene and his family live in Stevenson Ranch, California. He has two younger siblings, a sister named Libriti and a brother named Ethan. Libriti was diagnosed with leukemia when she was five years old, but went into remission four years later. Outside of baseball, Greene enjoys painting and playing the violin.

References

External links

Hunter Greene at MaxPreps

1999 births
African-American baseball players
Baseball players from California
Billings Mustangs players
Chattanooga Lookouts players
Cincinnati Reds players
Dayton Dragons players
Living people
Louisville Bats players
Major League Baseball pitchers
People from Sherman Oaks, Los Angeles
Sportspeople from Los Angeles County, California
21st-century African-American sportspeople
Notre Dame High School (Sherman Oaks, California) alumni